Schiffman is a surname. Notable people with the surname include:

Lawrence Schiffman
Rebecca Schiffman
Suzanne Schiffman
Tony Schiffman
Guillaume Schiffman

See also
Bernard Shiffman (born 1942), American mathematician
Daniel Shiffman (born 1973), American computer programmer and NYU professor
Max Shiffman (1914–2000), American mathematician
Yale Schiffman (born 1938), American environmental scientist and author